The 1964–65 National Football League was the 34th staging of the National Football League (NFL), an annual Gaelic football tournament for the Gaelic Athletic Association county teams of Ireland.

Galway won the home competition with a win over Kerry in the final. The play-off with New York was now two-legged: the hosts won the first game with a last-minute point, but on Independence Day Galway won in a rout.

Format

Group Stages

Division I

Inter-group play-offs

Division II

Division III

Knockout stages

Semi-finals

Finals

Galway win 24–17 on aggregate.

References

National Football League
National Football League
National Football League (Ireland) seasons